Emmanuel Lavar Stephens (born February 17, 1987) is an American football defensive end who is currently a free agent. He was signed by the Atlanta Falcons as an undrafted free agent in 2010. He played college football at Ole Miss.

College career
Stephens started his college football career at two-year community college Blinn College in Brenham, Texas where he played in 2006 and 2007. While at Blinn, he was selected to the 2007 All-America first-team by the National Junior College Athletic Association.

Stephens went on to enroll at Ole Miss where he played in 2008 and completed his college career in 2009.

Professional career

Atlanta Falcons
After going undrafted in the 2010 NFL Draft, Stephens signed with the Atlanta Falcons on April 26, 2010. He was released on September 4 and signed to the Falcons' practice squad the next day. Stephens spent the entire season on the practice squad and was re-signed to a reserve/future contract on January 18, 2011. The Falcons waived him during final cuts on September 3.

Cleveland Browns
Stephens was claimed off waivers by the Cleveland Browns on September 4.

Personal life
Stephens' wife is named Camica, also from Houston. The couple have a son named Lavar who was born September 5, 2007 and a daughter named Mia who is born November 15, 2011

References

External links
 Ole Miss Rebels bio

1987 births
Living people
American football defensive ends
Ole Miss Rebels football players
Atlanta Falcons players
Cleveland Browns players
Players of American football from Texas
People from Houston